Grace Episcopal Church is a historic Episcopal church in Chillicothe, Livingston County, Missouri.  The church was built between 1867 and 1869, and is a one-story, inexpensive prefabricated wooden church patterned after Early English Gothic churches. The church measures approximately 69 feet by 22 feet and is connected to the Andrew Leeper Memorial Parish Hall (1912) by a rectangular foyer.

It was listed on the National Register of Historic Places in 1980.

References

External links

Episcopal church buildings in Missouri
Churches on the National Register of Historic Places in Missouri
1867 establishments in Missouri
Buildings and structures in Livingston County, Missouri
19th-century Episcopal church buildings
Churches in Livingston County, Missouri
Chillicothe, Missouri
National Register of Historic Places in Livingston County, Missouri